Missing Filemon is a Filipino rock band from Cebu. The band was founded in 2002. They won a FAMAS Award for Best Theme Song for the 2007 film Confessional.

Discography

Albums
 Missing Filemon (2003)
 Sine Sine (2005)
 Kawanangan (2012)
 Dekada (2014)
 We Love our Titser Max Surban (2015)

Awards and nominations

|-
| 2008 || "Sine-Sine" || FAMAS Awards - Best Theme Song (for the movie Confessional) || 
|-
| 2016 || "Missing Filemon" || Awit Awards - Best New Artist (Group) || 
|-
| 2020 || "Missing Filemon" || 83rd Cebu City Charter Day - Most Outstanding Institution (Group) ||

References

External links
Missing Filemon Facebook Page
Missing Filemon Instagram
Missing Filemon YouTube Channel
Clarence Mongado Portfolio

Musical groups established in 2002
Filipino rock music groups
Cebuano rock bands
Musical groups from Cebu